Peppe Femling (born 24 March 1992) is a Swedish biathlete. He has competed in the Biathlon World Cup, and represented Sweden at the Biathlon World Championships 2016. He won an Olympic gold medal as part of the Swedish men's relay team in PyeongChang 2018.

Biathlon results
All results are sourced from the International Biathlon Union.

Olympic Games
1 medal (1 gold)

World Championships
1 medal (1 silver)

*During Olympic seasons competitions are only held for those events not included in the Olympic program.
**The single mixed relay was added as an event in 2019.

World Cup

References

External links

1992 births
Living people
People from Gävle
Swedish male biathletes
Biathletes at the 2018 Winter Olympics
Biathletes at the 2022 Winter Olympics
Olympic biathletes of Sweden
Medalists at the 2018 Winter Olympics
Olympic medalists in biathlon
Olympic gold medalists for Sweden
Biathlon World Championships medalists